Löhne is a town in the district of Herford, in North Rhine-Westphalia, Germany.

Geography
Löhne is situated on the river Werre, approx. 8 km north of Herford and 20 km south-west of Minden.

Neighbouring places
 Hüllhorst
 Bad Oeynhausen
 Vlotho
 Herford
 Hiddenhausen
 Kirchlengern

Twin towns – sister cities

Löhne is twinned with:
 Spittal an der Drau, Austria (1973)
 Columbus, United States (1993)
 Condega, Nicaragua (1994)
 Röbel, Germany (1996)
 Mielec, Poland (2002)

Notable people
Frederick Louis, Duke of Schleswig-Holstein-Sonderburg-Beck (1653–1728), Prussian field marshal
Philip Louis, Duke of Schleswig-Holstein-Sonderburg-Wiesenburg (1620–1689), founder and first duke of the line Schleswig-Holstein-Sonderburg-Wiesenburg

References

External links
 

Towns in North Rhine-Westphalia
Herford (district)